Archery competitions at the 2021 Junior Pan American Games in Cali, Colombia were held from November 25 to 28, 2021.

Medal summary

Medal table

Medalists

Recurve

Compound

See also
2021 Pan American Archery Championships
Archery at the 2020 Summer Olympics

References

Archery
Pan American Games
Qualification tournaments for the 2023 Pan American Games